New York's 56th State Assembly district is one of the 150 districts in the New York State Assembly. It has been represented by Stefani Zinerman since 2021.

Geography
District 56 is in Brooklyn, encompassing Bedford-Stuyvesant and portions of Crown Heights.

Recent election results

2022

2020

2018

2016

2014

2012

2010

References

56
Politics of Brooklyn